Giovanni Boccardi (died 1542) was an Italian miniature painter who lived at Florence. He was also known as Maestro Giovanni. During 1507–1523, Boccardi and his son Francesco painted the choir-books of Monte Cassino and Perugia.

References

1542 deaths
16th-century Italian painters
Italian male painters
Painters from Florence
Renaissance painters
15th-century births